Saidjamshid Jafarov (born 16 January 1999) is an Uzbekistani amateur boxer who won a gold medal at the 2022 Asian Championships as a middleweight.

Amateur boxing career

Asian championships
Jafarov took part in the 2022 Asian Amateur Boxing Championships, held in November 2022 in Amman, Jordan. He retained his middleweight (75 kg) throne after unloading heavy punches and sharp jabs against Kazakhstan's Nurkanat Raiys for a 5-0 romp.

References

External links
 
 
 
 
 

 

  https://www.youtube.com/watch?v=8tgWP32fKA4

Living people
People from Bukhara
People from Bukhara Region
Uzbekistani male boxers
Medalists in boxing
Universiade medalists in boxing
AIBA World Boxing Championships medalists
Asian Games medalists in boxing
Universiade gold medalists for Uzbekistan
Middleweight boxers
21st-century Uzbekistani people
1999 births